The 1958–59 OB I bajnokság season was the 22nd season of the OB I bajnokság, the top level of ice hockey in Hungary. Five teams participated in the league, and Voros Meteor Budapest won the championship.

Regular season

1st-4th place

External links
 Season on hockeyarchives.info

Hun
OB I bajnoksag seasons
1958–59 in Hungarian ice hockey